The Guest People is a Singaporean Chinese drama produced by Television Corporation of Singapore  (now Mediacorp Channel 8) in 1997.

Set in the 1930s to 1950s, the story is about four young Hakka men who migrated to Singapore from China and were caught in the tumultuous anti-colonial period of the country's history.

It stars Christopher Lee, Chen Hanwei, Xie Shaoguang, Jason Oh, Ann Kok and Jacelyn Tay. Others in the cast include Chen Huihui, Li Yinzhu, Chen Shucheng, Huang Peiru, Mai Hao Wei and Liang Wei Dong.

The drama was nominated for the Best Drama awards at the Asian Television Awards and the New York Television Festival in 1998.

It was dubbed in the Hakka language and broadcast in Taiwan, as well as in China.

External links
新加坡电视剧-《客家之歌》

Singapore Chinese dramas
1997 Singaporean television series debuts
Hakka culture in Singapore
Channel 8 (Singapore) original programming